is a Japanese former footballer and current manager Japan Football League club of ReinMeer Aomori

Career statistics

Club

Notes

Managerial statistics

References

External links

1965 births
Living people
People from Nerima
People from Tokyo
Sportspeople from Tokyo Metropolis
Association football people from Tokyo Metropolis
Japanese footballers
Tokyo Gakugei University alumni
Japan Football League players
Yokohama Flügels players
FC Tokyo players
J2 League managers
Matsumoto Yamaga FC managers
Japanese football managers
Association football defenders